Ludwig Traube (June 19, 1861 – May 19, 1907) was a paleographer and held the first chair of Medieval Latin in Germany (at the University of Munich). He was a son of the physician Ludwig Traube (1818–1876), and the brother of the chemist Margarete Traube (1856–1912).

Biography 
Traube was born in Berlin, the son of a middle-class Jewish family, and studied at the universities of Munich and Greifswald. In 1883 he finished his Ph.D. with a dissertation entitled Varia libamenta critica. He finished his habilitation in classical and medieval philology in 1888 with a part of his book on Carolingian poetry (Karolingische Dichtungen).

In 1897 he became a member of the central management of Monumenta Germaniae Historica. In 1902 he was appointed professor of Latin philology of the Middle Ages at Munich. In 1905 he discovered that he had leukemia, dying from it two years later.

Selected works 
 O Roma nobilis : philologische Untersuchungen aus dem Mittelalter, 1891 – O Roma nobilis: philological studies from the Middle Ages. 
 Textgeschichte der Regula S. Benedicti, 1898 – Textual history of Regula Benedicti. 
 Die Geschichte der tironischen Noten bei Suetonius und Isidorus, 1901 (2 volumes) – The history of Tironian notes from Suetonius and Isidorus.
 Jean-Baptiste Maugérard: ein Beitrag zur Bibliotheksgeschicthe, 1904 – Jean-Baptiste Maugérard, a contribution to library history.
 Bamberger Fragmente der vierten Dekade des Livius, 1906 – Bamberger fragments of the fourth decade of Livy.
 Nomina sacra : Versuch einer Geschichte der christlichen Kürzung, 1907 – Nomina sacra. Essay on the history of Christian abbreviations.
 Zur Paläographie und Handschriftenkunde, 1909 (edited by Franz Boll) – On palaeography and manuscript studies.
 Einleitung in die lateinische Philologie des Mittelalters, 1911 (edited by Franz Boll, Paul Lehmann) – Introduction to Latin philology of the Middle Ages. 
 Vorlesungen und Abhandlungen, 1909–1920 (3 volumes, edited by Franz Boll, Samuel Brandt) – Lectures and essays.

References

External links
 

1861 births
1907 deaths
19th-century German writers
19th-century German male writers
19th-century philologists
Deaths from leukemia
19th-century German Jews
German palaeographers
German philologists
Ludwig Maximilian University of Munich alumni
Academic staff of the Ludwig Maximilian University of Munich
People from the Province of Brandenburg
University of Greifswald alumni
Writers from Berlin